Nils Linde (Nils Harald Linde; July 18, 1890 – August 17, 1962) was a Swedish track and field athlete who competed in the 1912 Summer Olympics and in the 1920 Summer Olympics.

In 1912 he finished seventh in the hammer throw competition and ninth in the two handed discus throw event. Eight years later he finished again seventh in the hammer throw competition and eleventh in the 56 pound weight throw event.

References

External links
Profile 

1890 births
1962 deaths
Swedish male hammer throwers
Swedish male discus throwers
Olympic athletes of Sweden
Athletes (track and field) at the 1912 Summer Olympics
Athletes (track and field) at the 1920 Summer Olympics
Olympic weight throwers